Deserts Chang (born 30 May 1981) is a Taiwanese singer-songwriter.

Early life 
Deserts Chang was born as Chiao An-p'u on 30 May 1981 to a high socio-economic status family. Her father, Chiao Jen-ho, is a former secretary-general of the Straits Exchange Foundation. However, Chang has been quoted by the media as saying that she does not want to ride on the success of her father. Her stage name Deserts represents something "mysterious and suggests something hanging in limbo," a representation of her personality.

Chang started composing when she was 13 and began to perform on stage at 16. By the age of 19, Chang had written over 100 songs and got her first contract with Sony BMG., However, after recording, photo shooting and several campus performances, nothing happened. The young singer had waited for 5 years for the release of her debut album " My Life Will...”

Though she released her first album in 2006, Chang was well known among live houses, pubs and the Internet before that. Her light and clear voice is heart-touching and inspiring, which attracts many college students and independent music lovers. Chang is also a guitar player, and writes most of her songs with acoustic guitar.

Chang married her boyfriend Xu in August 2019 and gave birth to their first kid in September 2019.

Career 
Chang dropped out of high school because she "couldn't stand the conservative restrictions." She previously performed at pubs before entering the music recording industry.

She was a member of the rock band Mango Runs, named most popular act and winner of the Indie Music Award at the 2003 Hohaiyan Rock Festival in Taipei County. Mango Runs was featured in the 2004 documentary Ocean Fever (海洋熱), which followed the stories of several acts at the Hohaiyan Rock Festival.

Chang's debut album My Life Will... was released on 9 June 2006 under the record label Sony BMG. Although many of her fans objected to the recording deal, Chang promised that her style of music will not change. The album contains her music written between the ages of 13 and 19.

Her presence in the alternative music scene was demonstrated in the 18th Golden Melody Awards, where she received four award nominations. Her debut album was nominated for Best Mandarin Album along with mainstream musicians such as Jolin Tsai. It was previously considered unthinkable for a high-profile Chinese language music awards show to nominate independent artists in its major categories.

The singer has been enjoying growing popularity in Taiwan and Mainland China. At the 7th Chinese Music Media Awards in Hong Kong, Chang received the award for Best New Mandarin Artist.

She released her second album Oh, dear. dear. I haven't. (親愛的...我還不知道) on 20 July 2007. For the song 畢竟, she was nominated for Best Lyricist at the 19th Golden Melody Awards.

Since then, she has been joined by three other musicians (Cent, Goodtone, and Sunho) to create a band called Algae. On 22 May 2009, her third album City (城市) was released.

Chang released her fourth album in August 2012. The album named 神的遊戲 (Games We Play) was released under Sony music. The new album provides insights into Chang's life experiences over the past three years, in songs such as 如何; her constant advocacy for social issues, in song like 玫瑰色的你 (Rose-colored), for she won her first Golden Melody Award for the song's lyrics.

Musical style 
Using a guitar as her primary instrument. She is generally considered an indie artist despite having signed with recording giant Sony BMG.

Chang's most downloaded song Baby (寶貝) was written after she turned 13 following a fight with her mother. However, the full song was not realized until later when she had learned how to play a musical instrument.

Her Work
In her album named Games we Play, she published a song named 玫瑰色的你 (meaning the rose-coloured you). The song is used to show her respect towards all fighters for freedom and democracy.

Discography

Studio albums

EP

Soundtrack

Tours and performances 
 Spring Scream
 Formoz Festival
 The Wall Live House─Cat Power Warm Up
 Hohaiyan Rock Festival
 Modern Sky Festival
 In Music Festival
 S.H.E Top Girl Concert（Guests）
 Taiwan Music Night at Nouveau Casino, Paris, France
 Sodagreen「Walk Together」Concert Tour 2012（Guest）
 Fuji Rock Festival フジロック 2012, Naeba, Japan
 Deserts ＆ Algae To Ebb Tour 2014–2015 
 Taiwanese Wave at Central Park Summerstage Festival 2015, New York City, United States

Awards and nominations

Awards

Nominations

References

External links 

 Deserts Chang's official website
 Deserts Chang's blog
 

1981 births
Living people
21st-century Taiwanese singers
Taiwanese Mandopop singer-songwriters
21st-century Taiwanese women singers